The Genome Taxonomy Database (GTDB) is an online database that maintains information on a proposed nomenclature of prokaryotes, following a phylogenomic approach based on a set of conserved single-copy proteins. In addition to resolving paraphyletic groups, this method also reassigns taxonomic ranks algorithmically, updating names in both cases. Information for archaea was added in 2020, along with a species classification based on average nucleotide identity. Each update incorporates new genomes as well as automated and manual curation of the taxonomy.

An open-source tool called GTDB-Tk is available to classify draft genomes into the GTDB hierarchy. The GTDB system, via GTDB-Tk, has been used to catalogue not-yet-named bacteria in the human gut microbiome and other metagenomic sources.

The GTDB is incorporated into the Bergey's Manual of Systematics of Archaea and Bacteria in 2019 as its phylogenomic resource.

See also 
 PhyloCode
 National Center for Biotechnology Information
 SILVA ribosomal RNA database
 List of Prokaryotic names with Standing in Nomenclature

References 

Genome databases